Big Creek Township is a township in Ellis County, Kansas, USA, named for Big Creek, which flows diagonally through the township from the northwest to the southeast. As of the 2010 census, its population was 1,883.

Geography
Big Creek Township covers an area of  surrounding the city of Hays.  According to the USGS, it contains two cemeteries: Fort and Fort Hays Memorial Gardens.

A tributary to Big Creek, the stream of Chetolah Creek runs through this township, north to south through the eastern suburbs of Hays.

Transportation
Big Creek Township contains one airport, Hays Municipal Airport.

References
 USGS Geographic Names Information System (GNIS)

External links

 US-Counties.com
 City-Data.com

Townships in Ellis County, Kansas
Townships in Kansas